The Caregivers (simplified Chinese: Missy 先生) is a nursing and medical show which made its debut on 12 March 2014. It stars Thomas Ong , Tong Bing Yu , Terence Cao , Xiang Yun , Jayley Woo , Bonnie Loo & Tracy Lee as the casts of the series. The show aired at 9pm on weekdays and had a repeat telecast at 8am the following day.

Cast

Trivia 
Bonnie Loo  & Zhou Ying  made Cameo Appearances
 Edwin Goh  7th Drama Series
 Thomas Ong  & Tong Bing Yu first on screen couple
 Youyi 1st Drama Series
 This is the first Medical drama followed by You Can Be an Angel Too  & You Can Be an Angel 2

Awards & Nominations

Star Awards 2015

See also
List of programmes broadcast by Mediacorp Channel 8

References

Chinese television shows
Singaporean medical television series